The Raad 85 (Thunder 85) (Also R'ad 85, Ra'ad 85, etc)  is an Iranian loitering munition developed in the 2010s. It was designed by the Iranian Army's Research and Self-sufficiency Jihad Organization in cooperation with Qods Aviation for the Iranian Army Ground Force.  It is an unmanned "suicide drone" that is remotely guided to its target by a human operator. It is designed to be operated in an electronic warfare environment.

A Commander of the Iranian Army Ground Force Brigadier General Ahmad Reza Pourdastan has stated, "This drone is like a mobile bomb, and is capable of destroying fixed and mobile targets." The accuracy is not known with certainty.

Specifications 
Ceiling: 11000 ft
Top Speed: 250 km/h
Combat radius: 100 km
Avionics: transmitting imagery

References

 

 

Unmanned military aircraft of Iran
Iranian military aircraft
Aircraft manufactured in Iran
Islamic Republic of Iran Air Force
Post–Cold War military equipment of Iran
Unmanned aerial vehicles of Iran